Sketch is the second album by Miami Beach-based indie rock band Ex Norwegian. It was self-produced and originally self-released in June 2010. On November 15, 2011, it was released by Dying Van Gogh Records with the song Girl With The Moustache replacing Tired Of Dancing. The album reached #87 on the CMJ charts. Sketch was the last album recorded with bassist Nina Souto and drummer Arturo Garcia.

Track listing
 "Jet Lag" - 3:10
 "Smashing Time" - 3:01
 "Mind Down" - 3:17
 "Sky Diving" - 3:18
 "You're Elastic Over Me" - 1:58
 "Seconds" - 3:31
 "Upper Hand" - 2:30
 "Turn Left" - 3:13
 "Acting On An Island" - 3:42
 "Girl With The Moustache" - 3:13

References

2011 albums
Ex Norwegian albums